Anton Fryslie (June 29, 1859 – February 29, 1935) was a member of the South Dakota House of Representatives.

Biography
Fryslie was born on June 29, 1859, in Jordan, Wisconsin. He was married to Mary Glisne.

Career
Fryslie was a member of the House of Representatives twice. First, from 1901 to 1904 and second, from 1909 to 1910. Additionally, he was Treasurer of Vienna, South Dakota. He was a Republican. He died on February 29, 1935. His great-grandson Art Fryslie also served in the South Dakota Legislature.

References

External links

People from Jordan, Wisconsin
People from Clark County, South Dakota
Republican Party members of the South Dakota House of Representatives
1859 births
1935 deaths
20th-century American politicians